Vista was an unincorporated community in Buchanan County, Iowa, United States. It was located at the junction of local roads Freeman Avenue and 260th Street.

History

Founded in the 19th century, Vista appeared on maps as early as the 1870s. The Vista post office opened in 1889 and closed in 1904. Vista's population was 28 in 1917; only a few farmhouses remain.

References

Unincorporated communities in Buchanan County, Iowa
Unincorporated communities in Iowa